Persidskoye (Persidski) is a rural locality (a selo) in Bolshezadoyevsky Selsoviet, Kizlyarsky District, Republic of Dagestan, Russia. The population was 235 as of 2010. There are 3 streets.

Geography 
Persidskoye is located 20 km northeast of Kizlyar (the district's administrative centre) by road, on the left bank of the Stary Terk River. Bolshebredikhinskoye and Novogladovka are the nearest rural localities.

Nationalities 
Azerbaijanis live there.

References 

Rural localities in Kizlyarsky District